Matt Redmile (born 12 November 1976) is a professional footballer who most recently played for Goole in the Northern Premier League Division One South. His position on the pitch is central defender.

Playing career
Born in Nottingham, he started his football career at local side Notts County as a trainee before joining Shrewsbury Town for £30,000 in 2000 - a transfer paid for in part by the Shrewsbury Town fans through their Independent Supporters Club. He had previously been on loan there.

Redmile then moved to Scarborough and Barnet before signing for Tamworth in July 2004 after impressing in the Lambs' pre-season campaign.

During his time with Tamworth, Redmile scored one of Tamworth's most important goals. He scored the winning goal against League One side Hartlepool United, which booked Tamworth's place in the 3rd round draw of the FA Cup.

On 24 August 2006, Redmile left the Lambs for rivals Hinckley United, but after lasting less than a year, he was released by Hinckley in May, 2007. In July 2007 he joined Sutton Town.

References

External links
 

1976 births
Living people
Footballers from Nottingham
English footballers
England semi-pro international footballers
Association football defenders
Notts County F.C. players
Shrewsbury Town F.C. players
Scarborough F.C. players
Barnet F.C. players
Tamworth F.C. players
Hinckley United F.C. players
Sutton Town A.F.C. players
Goole A.F.C. players
English Football League players